Joseph of Hesse-Rotenburg (23 September 1705 – 24 June 1744) was the Hereditary Prince of Hesse-Rotenburg from his birth till his death in 1744. He was heir apparent to the Landgraviate of Hesse-Rotenburg.

Biography

Born at Langenschwalbach, he was the eldest child of Ernest Leopold, Landgrave of Hesse-Rotenburg and his wife Eleonore of Löwenstein-Wertheim-Rochefort. He was Heir apparent to the Landgraviate of Hesse-Rotenburg from his birth, and held the title till his death.

His siblings included Polyxena, future Queen of Sardinia; Caroline, future Princess of Condé and wife of Louis Henri, Duke of Bourbon, Prime Minister of France. His youngest sister Christine was Princess of Carignan and mother of the princesse de Lamballe.

He married Princess Christine of Salm, daughter of Ludwig Otto, Prince of Salm, and Princess Albertine of Nassau-Hadamar on 9 March 1726. The couple were married at Anholt and later produced four children, two of which would die young and one who would go on to have progeny.

He died at the Palace of the Landgrave's in Rotenburg an der Fulda (Schloss Rotenburg). In 1753, his wife married again Nicolaus Leopold, Prince of Salm-Salm but had no children. His youngest brother Constantine became Hereditary Prince and later became Landgrave of Hesse-Rotenburg.

Issue
Landgravine Anna Viktoria (25 February 1728 – 1 July 1792) married Charles, Prince of Soubise, no issue;
Landgravine Maria Ludovika Eleonore (18 April 1729 – 6 January 1800) married Friedrich Ernst Maximilian of Salm-Salm, Duke of Hoogstraeten, had issue;
Landgravine Leopoldine Dorothea Elisabeth Marie (1 October 1731 – ?) died in infancy;
Landgrave Ernest (28 May 1735 – 6 June 1742) died in infancy.

Ancestry

References and notes

1705 births
1744 deaths
People from Bad Schwalbach
House of Hesse-Kassel
Heirs apparent who never acceded
18th-century German people
Landgraves of Hesse-Rotenburg
Sons of monarchs